El rápido de las 9.15 is a 1941 Mexican black-and-white drama film directed by Alejandro Galindo. It premiered on September 11, 1941.

Cast
Virginia Fábregas
Alfredo del Diestro 
Miguel Inclán
Carlos López Moctezuma
Alejandro Cobo
Enrique García Álvarez
Gloria Marín
Edmundo Espino
Carmen Conde
Roberto Banquells
Rafael Baledón
Lucila Bowling
Ángel T. Sala
Salvador Ibáñez

References

External links

1941 films
Mexican black-and-white films
1940s Spanish-language films
1941 drama films
Mexican drama films
1940s Mexican films